Fazeli (also Romanized as Fāẕelī) is a village in Chah Varz Rural District, in the Central District of Lamerd County, Fars Province, Iran. At the 2006 census, its population was 137, in 33 families.

References 

Populated places in Lamerd County